Tayemeh or Taimeh or Taemeh may refer to:
 Tayemeh, Malayer
 Tayemeh, Nahavand